Anabel is an unincorporated community in eastern Macon County, Missouri, United States. It is located on U.S. Route 36, approximately seven miles east of Macon.

History
Variant names were "Beverly" and "Round Grove". A post office called Round Grove was established in 1869, the name was changed to Beverley in 1870, the name changed once again to Anabel in 1889, and the post office closed in 1999. The present name of Anabel was the name of the daughter of a local storekeeper, according to local history.

In 1925, Anabel had 63 inhabitants.

References

Unincorporated communities in Macon County, Missouri
Unincorporated communities in Missouri